Paprika is a ground spice made from dried red pepper.

Paprika may also refer to:

Arts and entertainment

Literature and animation
 Paprika (novel), a 1993 Japanese novel by Yasutaka Tsutsui
 Paprika (2006 film), a Japanese anime film directed by Satoshi Kon, based on the 1993 novel
 Paprika, a 2018 animated TV series by Xilam

Film
 Paprika (1932 film), a German comedy directed by Carl Boese
 Paprika (1933 French film), a French comedy directed by Jean de Limur
 Paprika (1933 Italian film), an Italian comedy directed by Carl Boese
 Paprika (1959 film), a West German comedy film
 Paprika (1991 film), a film about prostitution directed by Tinto Brass

Other uses
 "Paprika" (song), by Foorin, 2018
 Paprika, a character from TV series Blue's Clues
 Paprika, a character in the video game Them's Fightin' Herds.

People
 Paprika Steen (Kirstine Steen, born 1964), a Danish actress
 Elis Paprika (Erika Elizabeth Nogues, born 1980), a Mexican singer-songwriter
 Jenő Paprika (born 1960), a Hungarian gymnast

Other uses
 TV Paprika, a Hungarian television channel 
 Paprika Rádió, a Hungarian language radio station broadcasting in Romania
 Potentially all pairwise rankings of all possible alternatives (PAPRIKA), a technique for multi-criteria decision-making

See also
 
 Bell pepper
 Chicken paprikas, or paprika chicken